Repower may refer to:

Repowering, the process of replacing older power stations with newer ones
REpower Systems, a German wind turbine company
Repower (Swiss company), a Swiss energy utility